Leptolalax solus is a frog species in the family Megophryidae. It is endemic to Thailand where it is only known from its type locality, Hala Bala Wildlife Sanctuary in Narathiwat Province near the Malaysian border; it is likely that its range extends to Malaysia. The type collection consists of a single adult frog (the holotype), which measured  in snout-vent length.

References

solus
Endemic fauna of Thailand
Amphibians of Thailand
Amphibians described in 2006
Taxobox binomials not recognized by IUCN